St John's Estate is a housing scheme in Cubitt Town, on the Isle of Dogs in London. Centred on the triangle formed by Manchester Road, East Ferry Road and Glengall Grove, it was developed by Poplar Borough Council after the Second World War. It is served by Crossharbour DLR station to which it is adjacent.

John Betjeman described it as "one of the best new housing estates I have seen since the war, comparable with Lansbury, intimately proportioned, cheerful and airy yet London-like".

See also
 Samuda Estate
 Lansbury Estate

References

Housing estates in the London Borough of Tower Hamlets